Shannon Dawson (born August 9, 1977) is the offensive coordinator and quarterbacks coach at the University of Miami. Previously, he has been the offensive coordinator at Houston, Kentucky, West Virginia and Southern Miss.

Coaching career

Early coaching
Dawson began his coaching career as a receivers coach at his alma mater in 2002. Dawson the began coaching with Hal Mumme in 2003 at Southeastern Louisiana where he was an offensive quality control coach and the team’s running backs coach in 2004. He also coached with Mumme in 2005 at New Mexico State working as a graduate assistant. Dawson went to Millsaps College as offensive coordinator and quarterbacks coach in 2006 coaching there for two seasons. Dawson moved to Stephen F. Austin University in 2008 working once again as an offensive coordinator and quarterbacks coach, he would coach there until 2010.

West Virginia
Dawson helped build some of the nation’s most prolific offenses at West Virginia, where he coached from 2011–2014, with his last three as offensive coordinator. In his final season in Morgantown, WVU ranked 12th in the nation in total offense, averaging 499.8 yards per game, and was ninth nationally in passing offense at 317 yards per contest. The Mountaineers averaged 33.5 points per game and set a school record by scoring at least 30 points in eight consecutive games. WVU also averaged more than 182 rushing yards per game.

Kentucky
Dawson spent the 2015 season as the offensive coordinator and quarterbacks coach at Kentucky after being hired away from West Virginia only to be let go after one year.

Southern Miss
Dawson would spend three seasons with Golden Eagles and the offensive coordinators and quarterbacks coach. In his first season he mentored Nick Mullens in his senior season.

Houston
Dawson joined the Houston Cougars on Jan. 11, 2019 as the team’s tight ends coach  under head coach Dana Holgorsen who coached him as a player at Wingate in 1999. In January 2020, he was promoted to offensive coordinator and quarterbacks coach. In Dawson's three seasons as Houston's quarterbacks coach, the Cougars combined to throw 87 touchdown passes (13th nationally) with a 65.3 completion percentage (19th nationally).

Family
Dawson and his wife, Chelsea, have a daughter, Acelyn.

References

Living people
1977 births
American football quarterbacks
American football wide receivers
Miami Hurricanes football coaches
Houston Cougars football coaches
Kentucky Wildcats football coaches
New Mexico State Aggies football coaches
People from Clinton, Louisiana
Players of American football from Louisiana
Southern Miss Golden Eagles football coaches
West Virginia Mountaineers football coaches